"Dream Lover" is a song from English indie rock band the Vaccines. The track was released in the United Kingdom on 18 May 2015 as the second single from the band's third studio album, English Graffiti (2015). The track premiered on 30 March as BBC Radio 1 DJ Huw Stephens' Hottest Record in the World. Frontman Justin Young described the track as "the best pop song we've written".

Track listing

Charts

Release history

References

2015 singles
2014 songs
The Vaccines songs
Columbia Records singles